Andrew Anderson (born 7 August 1953) is a Scottish former footballer who played as a central defender; his only club at the professional level was Partick Thistle, where he spent eleven seasons, making 282 appearances for the Jags in all competitions and scoring five goals.

Aside from one season in the second tier, which involved an immediate promotion as 1975–76 Scottish First Division winners, his time at Firhill was spent entirely in the Scottish Premier Division. Anderson was only a teenage reserve when Partick won the Scottish League Cup in 1971, but did claim a Glasgow Cup medal in 1981. He also worked as a driver, both during his playing career and after retiring from senior football (which he did at the age of 28).

References

1953 births
Living people
Footballers from Glasgow
Scottish footballers
Footballers from North Lanarkshire
People from Cumbernauld
Association football central defenders
Scotland youth international footballers
Partick Thistle F.C. players
Scottish Football League players